John Chase Brook is a river in Greene County in the state of New York. It flows into Schoharie Creek by Jewett Center.

References

Rivers of New York (state)
Rivers of Greene County, New York